Manta is a comune (municipality) in the Province of Cuneo in the Italian region Piedmont, located about  southwest of Turin and about  north of Cuneo.

The main attraction is the Castello della Manta, housing a series of precious 15th-century paintings.

Manta borders the following municipalities: Lagnasco, Pagno, Saluzzo, and Verzuolo.

References

External links
 Official website

Cities and towns in Piedmont